Kris Kross Amsterdam is a Dutch DJ and record producer trio formed by brothers Jordy and Sander Huisman and Yuki Kempees. Their music is a mix of various music styles including R&B, hip hop, funk, soul, pop and house.

The name is a nod to the famous rap duo Kris Kross from the early 1990s, known for their hit single "Jump".

Career

Kris Kross Amsterdam originated as two brothers in 2011 in Amsterdam. With their name paying homage to the legendary American hip hop duo Kris Kross, they started hosting parties in Amsterdam where they began to play a mix of R&B, hip hop, twerk, trap and house. In 2014, MC Yuki Kempees joined them.

In June 2015 Kris Kross Amsterdam signed a deal with dance record label Spinnin’ Records and released their debut single "Until the Morning" with MC CHOCO.

In February 2016, KKA dropped multiple releases on the label, catching worldwide attention. Amongst those releases are the international hit single "Sex" with American electronic music trio Cheat Codes, which samples the chorus from "Let's Talk About Sex"., Are You Sure?, a collaboration with British pop star Conor Maynard and American hip hop artist Ty Dolla $ign, and the most recent release with Conor and The Boy Next Door, "Whenever". This track originated from Shakira's "Whenever, Wherever". The song got over a million streams each day and charted on the Billboard Dance Chart.

Next to making singles, they do shows worldwide. They hosted several stages and highlighted sets at Mysteryland (NL), Tomorrowland (BE), Parookaville (GE), Ultra Music Festival (US).

Discography

Singles

Remixes

2016: Dvbbs and Shaun Frank featuring Delaney Jane - "La La Land" (Kris Kross Amsterdam Remix)
2016: David Guetta featuring Zara Larsson - "This One's for You" (Kris Kross Amsterdam Remix)
2016: Britney Spears featuring G-Eazy - "Make Me..." (Kris Kross Amsterdam Remix)

References

Sources

External links
 

Dutch DJs
Dutch electronic music groups
Dutch dance music groups
Dutch hip hop groups
Musical groups from Amsterdam
2011 establishments in the Netherlands
Musical groups established in 2011
Dutch musical trios
Spinnin' Records artists